Áššu was a Northern Sámi-language newspaper published twice a week and distributed across Norway, Sweden, Finland, and Russia. In 2008, Áššu ceased publication to merge with the rival paper Min Áigi to form Ávvir.

History
Áššu (the word áššu translates into English as "glowing embers") launched in October 1993 as a rival to Min Áigi, which had launched earlier that year following the bankruptcy of the influential Sámi Áigi newspaper. Headquartered in Guovdageaidnu, Norway, the paper was published by Aviisa AS and co-owned by Nordavis AS. Despite having a readership across Sápmi, Áššu was positioned as a more local, traditional newspaper compared to the more political and nationally oriented Min Áigi.

Merger
On 27 August 2007, Áššu and its rival Min Áigi announced plans to merge to create a Northern Sámi-language daily newspaper, Ávvir. A week after Áššu published its final issue, Ávvir launched on 6 February 2008, the Sami National Day. Min Áigi chairman Magne Svineng stated that due to higher production costs, mergering Áššu and Min Áigi was the only way to meet the need for a daily Sámi-language newspaper with wide distribution. Ávvir maintained editorial bureaus in Kárášjohka and Guovdageaidnu, the respective headquarters of Min Áigi and Áššu.

Circulation

See also
Min Áigi
Ávvir

References

1993 establishments in Norway
Kautokeino
Newspapers established in 1993
Northern Sámi-language newspapers
Sámi in Norway
Sámi newspapers